is the first Japanese studio album by the South Korean boy band Infinite. It was released on June 5, 2013, in two different editions. The album is the first audio-related release of the group under Universal Music Japan's sublabel Universal D.

Background
The album's release was announced by the group's Korean label, Woollim Entertainment, on March 29, 2013, withd the release day, prices and details about the editions. On April 10, a promotional photograph of the album was released. On April 24, the cover of the regular edition, track list and the album's title were revealed.

Editions
Regular edition (POCS-1087): The regular edition includes the CD only, a 36-page booklet, a random card and a lottery ticket to an event.
Limited edition (POCS-9030): The limited edition has, along with the standard track list of the album, a DVD with all of the Japanese music videos released to date, a 52-page photobook, a 20-page photobook of a member (randomly chosen) and a lottery ticket to an event.

Composition
The album has twelve tracks, all Japanese versions of songs previously recorded in Korean. The songs "Welcome to Our Dream" and "Man in Love" were released on the fourth Korean mini-album New Challenge. "To-Ra-Wa", a Japanese version of the song "Dasi Dorawa", "She's Back" and "Wings" were released on the group's first Korean mini-album, First Invasion. "BTD (Before the Dawn)" was released on the second Korean mini-album, Evolution. "Be Mine", "Tic Toc", "Timeless", "Crying", "Because" and "Julia" were released on their first Korean studio album Over the Top. The Japanese version of "Crying", a song of the group's sub-unit Infinite H, features the Japanese television personality and singer Becky♪♯.

Singles
Three songs from the album were released as singles:

The first single, a Japanese version of the song "BTD (Before the Dawn)", was released on November 19, 2011. It peaked at number seven in ''Oricons weekly chart, selling 26,333 copies in its first week.

The second single, a Japanese version of "Be Mine", was released on April 18, 2012. It peaked at number two in Oricon'''s weekly chart, selling 50,473 copies in its first week. The B-side, "Julia", was included on the album.

The third and final single, a Japanese version of "She's Back", was released on August 29, 2012. It peaked at number three in Oricons  weekly chart, selling 38,998 copies in its first week. The B-side, "To-Ra-Wa", was also included on the album.

Chart performance
The album entered Oricon Chartat #1 following its releas, selling 40,767 copies on the first day. In its first week on the chart, the album sold 69,647 copies, making it number 1 on the Oricon Weekly Album Chart. In its second week on the chart, the album dropped to number 18, selling another 4,178 copies.

Track listing

Charts, sales and certifications

Charts

Sales and certifications

Release history

References

External links
Koi ni Ochiru Toki special website

2013 debut albums
Japanese-language albums
Universal Music Japan albums
Infinite (group) albums